Life Like is The Rosebuds' fourth album, released on October 7, 2008, on Merge Records.

The album made #1 on KTUH's charts on the week of October 27, 2008.

Track listing

References

External links
Life Like release info from MergeRecords.com

The Rosebuds albums
2008 albums
Merge Records albums